Ragnvald Anderson Nestos (April 12, 1877July 15, 1942) was a Norwegian-American politician who served as the 13th Governor of North Dakota from 1921 to 1925.

Early life
Ragnvold Anderson Nestos was a native of Voss, Norway. He was the son of Andres R. Nestos and Herborg Saue. One of ten children, he was sixteen and spoke no English when he came to the United States to live with his aunt and uncle at Buxton, North Dakota. He entered the first grade at Buxton and attended school in between working odd jobs and working at lumber camps out of state. Four years later, in 1897, he passed the teachers' examinations and taught in a country school. He completed his studies at Mayville State University, a teachers' college, while homesteading in Pierce County. In 1904, he graduated from the University of North Dakota and moved to Minot, where he began practicing law with a partner, attorney C. A. Johnson.

Political career
Nestos was a member of the Independent Voters Association, running on the Republican ticket. He was a member of North Dakota State House of Representatives, 1911–12; Ward County State's Attorney, 1913–16; and a primary candidate for U.S. Senator from North Dakota, 1916. He gained office when Governor Lynn Frazier was defeated in the first successful attempt to recall a state governor in U.S. history.

Frazier's term was plagued with controversy and a grassroots movement was started to press for his recall. The recall election that removed Governor Frazier had also removed two other members of the state's "Industrial Commission" from office. It was a time of bitter political discontent between the NPL (Nonpartisan League, which supported state-owned industry) and the IVA (Independent Voters Association, which opposed state ownership of industries). Nestos worked hard to make the new state-owned businesses (State Mill and Elevator and the Bank of North Dakota) a success. He also campaigned against illiteracy. During his administration, North Dakota came into national compliance for registering births and deaths, and the state had a full-time health officer for the first time. He ran for, and completed, a second term of office.

Legacy and death
Nestos never married.

He received national recognition for his work on behalf of the Boy Scouts of America. He was a "Silver Buffalo Award" winner (1942). He was active within the Norwegian Lutheran Church of America.

Nestos died of a stroke on July 15, 1942.  He is buried in Rosehill Cemetery in Minot, North Dakota.

See also
List of U.S. state governors born outside the United States

References

Further reading
 Gunderson, Carl M. Ringen Historie om guvernør Ragnvald Nestos med hans stamtavle : Førhenverende guvernør og senator av North Dakota, U.S.A. (Los Angeles, 1964) [In Norwegian].

External links
Biography of Ragnvold A. Nestos from the Historical Society of North Dakota website

1877 births
1942 deaths
Republican Party members of the North Dakota House of Representatives
Republican Party governors of North Dakota
University of North Dakota alumni
North Dakota lawyers
American Lutherans
Norwegian emigrants to the United States
People from Voss
People from Traill County, North Dakota
People from Ward County, North Dakota
Mayville State University alumni
Norwegian Lutherans
Independent Voters Association state governors of the United States
20th-century American politicians